Epipomponia nawai is a moth in the Epipyropidae family. It was described by Harrison Gray Dyar Jr. in 1904. It is found in Japan and Taiwan.

The wingspan is about 22 mm. The wings are entirely black, the forewings with many bluish-metallic scales.

Life cycle

References

Moths described in 1904
Epipyropidae